UCQ may refer to:
 Central Queensland University, Queensland, Australia
 University of Calgary in Qatar, a campus of the Canadian university
 Quebec Citizens' Union (French: Union citoyenne du Québec), a former political party in Quebec, Canada
 Union of conjunctive queries, a query language on relational databases